Port Nelson  may refer to:
 Port Nelson, Bahamas
 Port Nelson, Manitoba
 Port Nelson, Newfoundland and Labrador
 Port Nelson, Australia
 Port Nelson, New Zealand
 Port Nelson dredge, active in Port Nelson, Manitoba, from 1914 to 1918, wrecked in 1924